Joseph Jean Stéphen Henri Azéma (18 October 1861 in Saint-Denis – ?) was a Réunionnais doctor.  He was the son of historian Georges Azéma, and also served as a local councillor on Réunion.  His maternal uncle was the journalist Louis Brunet.
He was a doctor of the colonial Hospital of La Réunion, the General Council and deputy mayor of Saint-Denis and was made Chevalier of the  Légion d'honneur in 1905.

References

Biography

People from Saint-Denis, Réunion
Physicians from Réunion
Politicians of Réunion
1861 births
Year of death missing
People of French descent from Réunion